The Paris Concert: Edition Two is a live album by jazz pianist Bill Evans with Marc Johnson and Joe LaBarbera recorded in Paris, France in 1979 and originally released on the Elektra/Musician label. Additional recordings from this concert were released as The Paris Concert: Edition One.

Reception
The Allmusic review by Scott Yanow awarded the album 4½ stars and states "The music is sensitive and subtly exciting... and serves as evidence that, rather than declining, he was showing a renewed vitality and enthusiasm in his last year".

Cover

The photograph of the cover was taken in the Parc de Sceaux (Grand canal).

Track listing
All compositions by Bill Evans except as indicated
 "Re: Person I Knew" - 5:22
 "Gary's Theme" (Gary McFarland) - 5:31
 "Letter to Evan" - 4:50
 "34 Skidoo" - 6:45
 "Laurie" - 8:06
 "Nardis" (Miles Davis) - 17:31
 Interview - 1:46

Personnel
Bill Evans - piano
Marc Johnson - bass
Joe LaBarbera - drums

References

Bill Evans live albums
1984 live albums
Elektra/Musician live albums